Tingkhong College, established in 1972, is a major and general degree college situated in Tingkhong, Dibrugarh district, Assam. This college is affiliated with the Dibrugarh University.

Departments

Arts
Assamese
English
History
Education
Economics
Philosophy
Political Science
Sociology

References

External links
https://www.tingkhongcollege.edu.in/

Universities and colleges in Assam
Colleges affiliated to Dibrugarh University
Educational institutions established in 1972
1972 establishments in Assam